Xylophanes colinae is a moth of the  family Sphingidae. It is known from Ecuador, French Guiana and Venezuela.

The wingspan is 72–78 mm. It is intermediate between Xylophanes ceratomioides and Xylophanes guianensis, but smaller, with more rounded wings and an even more strongly scalloped outer forewing margin than Xylophanes guianensis. The dorsal abdominal lines are as in Xylophanes ceratomioides, but the outer lines are more continuous from segment to segment. The pattern of the forewing upperside is most similar to Xylophanes ceratomioides, but generally the distal antemedian line and basal postmedian line meet on inner edge of the forewing upperside. There is pale brown excavated area on the outer margin of the postmedian band. The pale subbasal and median bands of the hindwing upperside are pale orange-brown.

Adults are probably on wing year-round.

The larvae possibly feed on Psychotria panamensis, Psychotria nervosa and Pavonia guanacastensis.

References

colinae
Moths described in 1994